The Gothic Building is a historic building in Akron, Ohio. It was designed by prominent Akron architect Frank O. Weary and built in 1902. Weary also designed a Carnegie Library  (Akron Public Library), county courthouses, and school buildings in Akron and other areas of Ohio, as well as significant buildings in other states. The Colonial Theatre was attached to the Gothic Building. The Gothic Building is listed on the National Register of Historic Places.

Tax credits for the redevelopment of historic buildings have been used to redevelop it and other historic buildings in downtown Akron by Tony Troppe.

The Gothic Building was documented for the Historic American Buildings Survey. It is described as Tudor revival architecture.

See also
National Register of Historic Places listings in Akron, Ohio

References

Italianate architecture in Ohio
Tudor Revival architecture in Ohio
National Register of Historic Places in Summit County, Ohio
Buildings and structures completed in 1902
1902 establishments in Ohio